The Rosberg-Holmgren-Clareen Block, also once known as the Clareen-Peterson Restaurant Building, is a historic building at 109-111-113 N. Main Street in Lindsborg, Kansas.

Tne building was built in 1899 for use as a restaurant with living quarters above by Swedish immigrant, Carl E. Clareen (1862-1923). By 1909, fellow Swedish immigrant John P. Peterson operated his restaurant known as the Royal Cafe on the first floor of the building. The first floor continued to serve as a restaurant through the 1940s. The building is of late Victorian style with Italianate detailing on its lower front exterior which includes cast iron columns. The building has many  distinguishing characteristics including the ornate second-story window hoods, cast-iron columns, the original storefront, and stained glass windows. The building added to the National Register of Historic Places in 2009.  Its listing was updated in 2016, resulting in a boundary increase and a renaming of the listing.

References

External links
National Register Nomination Form and Information

Cast-iron architecture in the United States
Restaurants in Kansas
Commercial buildings on the National Register of Historic Places in Kansas
Buildings designated early commercial in the National Register of Historic Places
Commercial buildings completed in 1899
Buildings and structures in McPherson County, Kansas
Restaurants established in 1899
Swedish-American culture in Kansas
1899 establishments in Kansas
Lindsborg, Kansas
National Register of Historic Places in McPherson County, Kansas
Restaurants on the National Register of Historic Places